Norman Paul Cotton (February 26, 1943July 31, 2021) was an American guitarist and singer-songwriter.  He was a member of the band Poco and the writer of their international hit song  "Heart of the Night". Before that, he was co-guitarist for the Illinois Speed Press.

Early life
Cotton was born in Fort Rucker, Alabama, on February 26, 1943.  He started learning the guitar when he was 13 years old, and became involved in his first band a year later.  He relocated to Illinois by age 16 and joined the Mus-Twangs, which later became the Illinois Speed Press.  He played for the group throughout the next decade until 1970, when it dissolved due to the divergent musical interests of him and Kal David.

Career
Cotton joined Poco in 1970, replacing Jim Messina.  Most of Cotton's music career was as songwriter, lead guitarist and lead singer for the group.  He said in a September 2000 interview with Sound Waves magazine, "I'm just drawn to the South. Hey, I spent 25 winters in Chicago."   Cotton's best known song with Poco is "Heart of the Night", which was a major hit from the band's Legend album, released in 1978; the song is an evocation of the night life of the city of New Orleans.

Cotton's experiences in New Orleans had been the basis for a previous composition, "Down in the Quarter", featured on the 1975 Poco album Head Over Heels, and Cotton has described a track from the 1982 Poco album Ghost Town, "Break of Hearts", as being a follow-up to "Heart of the Night.  In 1978, Cotton and Rusty Young, "got a little rehearsal hall, put together a band, and played 'Heart of the Night'" for ABC Records executives. Both tracks were credited to Poco.  He also penned such Poco classics as "Barbados", "Indian Summer", "Ride The Country", and "Bad Weather".  He briefly left the band in 1987, before returning in 1991.

Later life
Cotton moved to Key West, Florida, in 2005, shortly after Hurricane Wilma struck the area.  He met his future wife there, and went fishing, sailing and sunning when not working on his music.  He was actively involved in the Key West community performing at various benefit shows in the area.  Cotton left Poco in early 2010 and went on to release several solo albums.  He was inducted into the Colorado Music Hall of Fame, together with his fellow Poco bandmates.

Cotton died at his summer home near Eugene, Oregon on July 31, 2021, at the age of 78.

Solo discography
 1990 Changing Horses (Curb)
 2001 Firebird
 2004 When the Coast Is Clear
 2007 Sunset Kidd
 2014 100% Paul Cotton

References

External links
Paul Cotton Website
 

1943 births
2021 deaths
People from Dale County, Alabama
American rock guitarists
American male guitarists
Poco members
Guitarists from California
20th-century American guitarists
20th-century American male musicians
American country rock singers
American country singer-songwriters
American country guitarists
Guitarists from Alabama
American male singer-songwriters
Singer-songwriters from California
Singer-songwriters from Alabama